"Scared of the Police" is the debut single by Surrey-based rock band Reuben. It was recorded in December 2001 at EMI studios in London with Idlewild/80's Matchbox producer Paul Tipler, and was the first recording to be released with Guy Davis on drums. The band's press company had suggested that they release a single, so they approached Andy Ross of Food records to release it as the first record on his new label, Bossmusic. It was released in March 2002 and reached #87 in the UK chart, impressive for a small release, and received good reviews from the music magazines, most notably a KKKKK rating from Andrew W.K in that week's issue of Kerrang! magazine. The accompanying video, the band's first to be played on TV, was a surprise success and reached #2 in MTV2's Most Wanted chart.

Track listing
"Scared of the Police"
"Eating Only Apples"
"Wooden Boy"

Personnel
Jamie Lenman - Guitars, vocals
Jon Pearce: Bass Guitar
Guy Davis - Drums
Mark Lewton - Drums on "Wooden Boy"

Trivia
(From the band's site)
"Wooden Boy" was written when Guy was filling in for Mark as temporary drummer, but recorded with Mark on drums upon his return, at an earlier session with Tipler at EMI studios.
At the time of going into the studio, the band didn't know that the songs they were recording would necessarily be put on a single, they just recorded the two newest ones they had.
Eating Only Apples was considered as a possible A side, early on. The song is also featured on the band's debut album, Racecar Is Racecar Backwards.
The video features record mogul Andy Ross and the band's press agent Andy Hart as policemen.
The artwork for this and the following two singles was created by Edd Pearman, a friend of the band.

2002 singles
Reuben (band) songs
2002 songs
Songs written by Jamie Lenman